Sheikh Mujibur Rahman (17 March 1920 – 15 August 1975), often shortened as Sheikh Mujib or Mujib, also widely known as Bangabandhu, was a Bangladeshi politician, statesman and the founding leader of the People's Republic of Bangladesh. He first served as the titular president of the Provisional Government of Bangladesh between April 1971 and January 1972. He then served as Prime Minister of Bangladesh from the Awami League between January 1972 and January 1975. He finally served as President again during BAKSAL from January 1975 till his assassination in August 1975. In 2011, the 15th constitutional amendment in Bangladesh referred to Sheikh Mujib as the Father of the Nation who declared independence; these references were enshrined in the fifth, sixth, and seventh schedules of the constitution.

Mujib emerged as a student activist in Bengal during the final years of the British Raj. He rose within the ranks of the Awami League as a fiery and charismatic orator. He became popular for his opposition to the ethnic and institutional discrimination of Bengalis in Pakistan, who comprised the largest ethnic group in the federation. He was elected to public office for the first time in 1954 and championed Bengali identity in Pakistan's constitution making process between 1955 and 1956. Mujib worked in the insurance industry on the sidelines of politics. At the heightening of tensions between East and West Pakistan, he outlined a six-point autonomy plan. He was often jailed for his protests against the Pakistani government. Mujib led the Awami League to win the first democratic election of Pakistan in 1970. Despite gaining a majority, the League was not invited by the ruling military junta to form a government. As civil disobedience erupted across East Pakistan, Mujib edged towards declaring the independence of Bangladesh in a historic speech on 7 March 1971. On 26 March 1971, Mujib declared Bangladesh's independence after the Pakistan Army responded to the mass protests with Operation Searchlight, in which Prime Minister–elect Mujib was arrested and flown to solitary confinement in West Pakistan, while the Bengali population suffered genocide. A nine-month war was fought in his name, which culminated in Pakistan's surrender on 16 December 1971. Mujib was released from Pakistani custody due to international pressure and returned home on 10 January 1972. The jubilation of Bangladeshis over the war's victory and Mujib's homecoming was tempered by the devastation and challenges faced by the new country.

Sheikh Mujib was a major populist leader of the 20th century. In governance, Mujib's legacies include the Constitution of Bangladesh, which was enacted within a year of Bangladesh's liberation; as well as the transformation of East Pakistan's state apparatus, bureaucracy, armed forces, and judiciary into an independent Bangladeshi state.    He delivered the first Bengali speech to the UN General Assembly in 1974. Mujib's five-year regime was the only socialist period in Bangladesh's history. In 1975, Mujib installed a one party state which lasted for seven months until his assassination. His legacy remains divisive among Bangladeshis due to his economic management, the Bangladesh famine of 1974, human rights violations, and authoritarianism. Most Bangladeshis credit him for leading the country to independence in 1971. Many within and outside Bangladesh call him Bangabandhu out of respect. In a 2004 BBC opinion poll, Mujib was voted as the Greatest Bengali of all time and ranked first on the list followed by Asia's first Nobel laureate Rabindranath Tagore (2nd) and Bangladeshi national poet Kazi Nazrul Islam (3rd). His 7 March speech is listed amongst UNESCO Memory of the World Register – Asia and the Pacific. Mujib's diaries and travelogues were published many years after his death and have been translated into several languages.

Early life and activism

Mujib was born in 1920 in the village of Tungipara in Gopalganj sub-division of Faridpur district in the province of Bengal in British India. His father Sheikh Lutfur Rahman was a sheristadar (law clerk) in the courthouse of Gopalganj; Mujib's mother Sayera Khatun was a housewife. They were a middle class Bengali Muslim family, and had Iraqi and Arab ancestry through his paternal grandfather Sheikh Abdul Hamid, who was a direct descendant of 15th-century Muslim preacher Sheikh Awwal of Baghdad. Mujib was the third child in a family of four daughters and two sons. His parents nicknamed him "Khoka".

In 1927, Mujib was enrolled in Gimadanga Primary School. In 1929, he entered the third grade of Gopalganj Public School. His parents transferred him to Madaripur Islamia High School after two years. Mujib withdrew from school in 1934 to undergo eye surgery. He returned to formal education after 4 years owing to the severity of the surgery and slow recovery. He began showing signs of political leadership around this time. At the Gopalganj Missionary School, Mujib's political passion was noticed by Huseyn Shaheed Suhrawardy, who was visiting the area along with A. K. Fazlul Huq. Mujib passed out from the Gopalganj Missionary School in 1942. Mujib moved to Calcutta for higher education. At the time, Calcutta was the capital of British Bengal and the largest city in undivided India. He studied liberal arts, including political science, at the erstwhile Islamia College of Calcutta and lived in Baker Hostel. Islamia College was one of the leading educational institutions for the Muslims of Bengal. He obtained his bachelor's degree from the college in 1947.

During his time in Calcutta, Sheikh Mujib became involved in the politics of the Bengal Provincial Muslim League, the All India Muslim Students Federation, the Indian independence movement and the Pakistan movement. In 1943, he was elected as a councillor of the Muslim League. In 1944, he was elected as secretary of the Faridpur District Association, a Calcutta-based association of residents from Faridpur. In 1946, at the height of the Pakistan movement, Mujib was elected as General Secretary of the Islamia College Students Union in Calcutta. His political mentor Suhrawardy led the center-left faction of the Muslim League. Suhrawardy was responsible for creating 36 trade unions in Bengal, including unions for sailors, railway workers, jute and cotton mills workers, rickshaw pullers, cart drivers and other working class groups. Mujib assisted Suhrawardy in these efforts and also worked to ensure protection for Muslim families during the violent days in the run up to partition.

After the partition of India, Mujib was admitted into the Law Department of the University of Dhaka. The university was created in 1921 as a residential university modelled on Oxford and Cambridge where students would be affiliated with colleges; but its residential character was dramatically changed after partition and students became affiliated with departments. Mujib founded the Muslim Students League on 4 January 1948 as the student wing of the Muslim League in East Bengal. This organisation later transformed into the Bangladesh Chhatra League. During the visit of Governor General Muhammad Ali Jinnah to Dhaka, it was declared that Urdu will be the sole national language of Pakistan. This sparked the Bengali Language Movement. Mujib became embroiled in the language movement, as well as left-wing trade unionism among Bengali factions of the Muslim League. Bengali factions eventually split away and formed the Awami Muslim League in 1949. These opposition political activities were targeted by the government and police. Mujib was arrested many times. In 1949, Mujib was expelled from Dhaka University on charges of inciting employees against the university. After 61 years, in 2010, the university withdrew its famously politically-motivated expulsion order.

Leader in Pakistan 
Mujib emerged as a major opposition figure in Pakistani politics between 1948 and 1971. He represented the Bengali grassroots. He had an uncanny ability to remember people by their first name regardless of whether they were political leaders, workers, or ordinary citizens. Mujib suffered repeated bouts of police detention due to his ability to instigate opposition protests against the Pakistani government. His movements were tracked by spies of the Pakistani government. He was accused of being a secessionist and an agent of India. East Pakistan's Intelligence Branch compiled many secret reports on his movements and political activities. The secret documents have been declassified by the Bangladeshi government. The formerly classified reports have also been published.

Founding of the Awami League

The All Pakistan Awami Muslim League was founded on 23 June 1949 at the Rose Garden mansion on K. M. Das Lane in Old Dhaka. Sheikh Mujib was elected as one of its joint secretaries. The term "Muslim" was later dropped from the party's nomenclature. The Awami League sought to represent both Muslims and Pakistan's religious minorities, including Bengali Hindus and Pakistani Christians. Hence, it dropped "Muslim" from its name to appeal to the minority votebanks. Suhrawardy joined the party within a few years and became its main leader. He relied on Sheikh Mujib to organise his political activities in East Bengal. Mujib became Suhrawardy's political protégé. Prior to partition, Suhrawardy mooted the idea of an independent United Bengal. But in Pakistan, Suhrawardy reportedly preferred to preserve the unity of Pakistan in a federal framework; while Mujib supported autonomy and was open to the idea of East Bengali independence. Mujib reportedly remarked that "[t]he Bengalis had initially failed to appreciate a leader of Mr. Suhrawardy’s stature. By the time they learned to value him, they had run out of time". At the federal level, the Awami League was led by Suhrawardy. At the provincial level, the League was led by Sheikh Mujib who was given a free reign over the party's activities by Suhrawardy. Mujib consolidated his control of the party. The Awami League veered away from the left-wing extremism of its founding president Maulana Bhashani. Under Suhrawardy and Mujib, the Awami League emerged as a centre-left party.

Language Movement
The Awami League strongly backed the Bengali Language Movement. Bengalis argued that the Bengali language deserved to be a federal language on par with Urdu because Bengalis formed the largest ethnic group in Pakistan. The movement appealed to the Constituent Assembly of Pakistan to declare both Urdu and Bengali as national languages, in addition to English. During a conference in Fazlul Huq Muslim Hall, Sheikh Mujib was instrumental in establishing the All-Party State Language Action Committee. He was repeatedly arrested during the movement. When he was released from jail in 1948, he was greeted by a rally of the State Language Struggle Committee. Mujib announced a nationwide student strike on 17 March 1948.

In early January 1950, the Awami League held an anti-famine rally in Dhaka during the visit of Prime Minister Liaquat Ali Khan. Mujib was arrested for instigating the protests. On 26 January 1952, Pakistan's then Prime Minister Khwaja Nazimuddin reiterated that Urdu will be the only state language. Despite his imprisonment, Mujib played a key role in organising protests by issuing instructions from jail to students and protestors. He played a key role in declaring 21 February 1952 as a strike day. Mujib went on hunger strike from 14 February 1952 in the prelude to the strike day. His own hunger strike lasted 13 days. On 26 February, he was released from jail amid the public outrage over police killings of protestors on 21 February, including Salam, Rafiq, Barkat, and Jabbar.

United Front

The League teamed up with other parties like the Krishak Praja Party of A. K. Fazlul Huq to form the United Front coalition. During the East Bengali legislative election, 1954, Mujib was elected to public office for the first time. He became a member of the East Bengal Legislative Assembly. This was the first election in East Bengal since the partition of India in 1947. The Awami League-led United Front secured a landslide victory of 223 seats in the 237 seats of the provincial assembly. Mujib himself won by a margin of 13,000 votes against his Muslim League rival Wahiduzzaman in Gopalganj. A. K. Fazlul Huq became Chief Minister and inducted Mujib into his cabinet. Mujib's initial portfolios were agriculture and forestry. After taking oath on 15 May 1954, Chief Minister Huq travelled with ministers to India and West Pakistan. The coalition government was dismissed on 30 May 1954. Mujib was arrested upon his return to Dhaka from Karachi. He was released on 23 December 1954. Governor's rule was imposed in East Bengal. The elected government was eventually restored in 1955.

On 5 June 1955, Mujib was elected to a newly reconstituted second Constituent Assembly of Pakistan. The Awami League organised a huge public meeting at Paltan Maidan in Dhaka on 17 June 1955 which outlined 21 points demanding autonomy for Pakistan's provinces. Mujib was a forceful orator at the assembly in Karachi. He opposed the government's plan to rename East Bengal as East Pakistan as part of the One Unit scheme. On 25 August 1955, he delivered the following speech.

Sir [President of the Constituent Assembly], you will see that they want to use the phrase 'East Pakistan' instead of 'East Bengal'. We have demanded many times that you should use Bengal instead of Pakistan. The word Bengal has a history and tradition of its own. You can change it only after the people have been consulted. If you want to change, we have to go back to Bengal and ask them whether they are ready to accept it. So far as the question of one unit is concerned it can be incorporated in the constitution. Why do you want it to be taken up right now? What about the state language, Bengali? We are prepared to consider one unit with all these things. So, I appeal to my friends on the other side to allow the people to give their verdict in any way, in the form of referendum or in the form of plebiscite.

Mujib later became provincial minister of commerce and industries in the cabinet of Ataur Rahman Khan. These portfolios allowed Mujib to consolidate his popularity among the working class. The Awami League's demand for Bengali as a federal language was successfully implemented in the 1956 constitution, which declared Urdu, Bengali and English as national languages. East Bengal, however, was renamed East Pakistan. In 1957, Mujib visited the People's Republic of China. In 1958, he toured the United States as part of the State Department's International Visitor Leadership Program. Mujib resigned from the provincial cabinet to work full time for the Awami League as a party organiser. Between 1956 and 1957, his mentor Suhrawardy served as the 5th Prime Minister of Pakistan. Suhrawardy strengthened Pakistan's relations with the United States and China. Suhrawardy was a strong supporter of Pakistan's membership in SEATO and CENTO. Suhrawardy's pro-Western foreign policy caused Maulana Bhashani to break away from the Awami League to form the National Awami Party. But Mujib remained loyal to Suhrawardy.

The 1958 Pakistani coup d'état ended Pakistan's first era of parliamentary democracy. The 1956 constitution was abolished. Martial law was imposed. General Ayub Khan emerged as the country's dictator. Many politicians were imprisoned and disqualified from holding public office, including Mujib's mentor Suhrawardy. A new constitution was introduced by Ayub Khan which curtailed universal suffrage and empowered electoral colleges to elect the country's parliament.

Mujib joined the Alpha Insurance Company in 1960. He continued to work in the insurance industry for many years.

Six point movement

Following Suhrawardy's death in 1963, Mujib became General Secretary of the All Pakistan Awami League with Nawabzada Nasrullah Khan as its titular president. The 1962 constitution introduced a presidential republic. Mujib was one of the key leaders to rally opposition to President Ayub Khan who enacted a system of electoral colleges to elect the country's parliament and president under a system known as "Basic Democracy". Universal suffrage was curtailed as part of the Basic Democracy scheme.

Mujib supported opposition candidate Fatima Jinnah against Ayub Khan in the 1965 presidential election. Fatima Jinnah, the sister of Pakistan's founder Muhammad Ali Jinnah, drew huge crowds in East Pakistan during her presidential campaign which was supported by the Combined Opposition, including the Awami League. East Pakistan was the hotbed of opposition to the dictatorship of Ayub Khan. Mujib became popular for voicing the grievances of the Bengali population, including under-representation in the military and central bureaucracy. Despite generating most of Pakistan's export earnings and customs tax revenue, East Pakistan received a smaller budget allocation than West Pakistan.

The 1965 war between India and Pakistan ended in stalemate. The Tashkent Declaration was domestically seen as giving away Pakistan's gains to India. Ayub Khan's foreign minister Zulfikar Ali Bhutto resigned from the government, formed the Pakistan Peoples Party, and exploited public discontent against the regime.

In 1965, Pakistan banned the works of Nobel laureate Rabindranath Tagore in state media. Censorship in state media spurred Bengali civil society groups like Chhayanaut to preserve Bengali culture. When Ayub Khan compared Bengalis to beasts, the poet Sufia Kamal retorted that "If the people are beasts then as the President of the Republic, you are the king of the beasts". The Daily Ittefaq led by Tofazzal Hossain voiced growing aspirations for democracy, autonomy, and nationalism. Economists in Dhaka University pointed to the massive reallocation of revenue to West Pakistan despite East Pakistan's role in generating most of Pakistan's export income. Rehman Sobhan paraphrased the Two-Nation Theory into the Two Economies Theory. He argued that East and West Pakistan had two fundamentally distinct economies within one country.

In 1966, Mujib put forward a 6-point plan at a national conference of opposition parties in Lahore. The city of Lahore was chosen because of its symbolism as the place where the Lahore Resolution was adopted by the Muslim League in 1940. The six points called for abolishing the Basic Democracy scheme, restoring universal suffrage, devolving federal power to the provinces of East and West Pakistan, separate fiscal, monetary and trade policies for East and West Pakistan, and increased security spending for East Pakistan.

 The constitution should provide for a Federation of Pakistan in its true sense on the Lahore Resolution and the parliamentary form of government with supremacy of a legislature directly elected on the basis of the universal adult franchise.
 The federal government should deal with only two subjects: defence and foreign affairs, and all other residuary subjects shall be vested in the federating states.
 Two separate, but freely convertible currencies for two wings should be introduced; or if this is not feasible, there should be one currency for the whole country, but effective constitutional provisions should be introduced to stop the flight of capital from East to West Pakistan. Furthermore, a separate banking reserve should be established and separate fiscal and monetary policy be adopted for East Pakistan.
 The power of taxation and revenue collection shall be vested in the federating units and the federal center will have no such power. The Federation will be entitled to a share in the state taxes to meet its expenditures.
 There should be two separate accounts for the foreign exchange earnings of the two wings; the foreign exchange requirements of the federal government should be met by the two wings equally or in a ratio to be fixed; indigenous products should move free of duty between the two wings, and the constitution should empower the units to establish trade links with foreign countries.
 East Pakistan should have a separate paramilitary forces.

Mujib's points catalysed public support across East Pakistan, launching what historians have termed the 6-point movement – recognised as the turning point towards East and West Pakistan becoming two nations. Mujib insisted on a federal democracy and obtained broad support from the Bengali population. In 1966, Mujib was elected as President of the Awami League. Tajuddin Ahmad succeeded him as General Secretary.

Agartala Conspiracy Case

Mujib was arrested by the Pakistan Army and after two years in jail, an official sedition trial in a military court opened. During his imprisonment between 1967 and 1969, Mujib began to write his autobiography. In what is widely known as the Agartala Conspiracy Case, Mujib and 34 Bengali military officers were accused by the government of colluding with Indian government agents in a scheme to divide Pakistan and threaten its unity, order and national security. The plot was alleged to have been planned in the city of Agartala in the bordering Indian state of Tripura. The outcry and unrest over Mujib's arrest and the charge of sedition against him destabilised East Pakistan amidst large protests and strikes. Various Bengali political and student groups added demands to address the issues of students, workers and the poor, forming a larger "11-point plan". The government caved to the mounting pressure, dropped the charges on 22 February 1969 and unconditionally released Mujib the following day. He returned to East Pakistan as a public hero. He was given a mass reception on 23 February, at the Ramna Race Course and conferred with the popular honorary title of Bangabandhu by Tofail Ahmed. The term Bangabandhu means Friend of the Bengal in the Bengali language. Several of Bengal's historic leaders were given similar honorary titles, including Sher-e-Bangla (Lion of Bengal) for A. K. Fazlul Huq, Deshbandhu (Friend of the Nation) for Chittaranjan Das, and Netaji (The Leader) for Subhash Chandra Bose.

Round Table Conference
In 1969, President Ayub Khan convened a Round Table Conference with opposition parties to find a way out of the prevailing political impasse. A few days after his release from prison, Mujib flew to Rawalpindi to attend the Round Table Conference. Mujib sought to bargain for East Pakistan's autonomy. Mujib was the most powerful opposition leader at the Round Table Conference. Ayub Khan shook hands with Mujib, whom Khan previously had imprisoned. Talking to British media, Mujib said "East Pakistan must get full regional autonomy. It must be self-sufficient in all respects. It must get its due share and legitimate share in the central administration. The West Pakistani people support [East Pakistani demands]. Only the vested interests want to divide the people of East and West Pakistan". When asked about the prospect of East Pakistan ruling West Pakistan if the Awami League gained power, Mujib replied that majority rule is important in a democracy but the people of East Pakistan had no intention to discriminate against West Pakistan, and that West Pakistani parties would continue to play an important role. Mujib toured West Pakistani cities by train after the Round Table Conference. West Pakistani crowds received him with chants of "Sheikh Saheb Zindabad!" (meaning Long Live the Sheikh!). He was received by huge crowds in Quetta, Baluchistan. He spoke to West Pakistani crowds in a heavily Bengali accent of Urdu, talking about chhey nukati (six points) and hum chhoy dofa mangta sab ke liye.

Mujib demanded that Pakistan accept his six-point plan for federal democracy. He wasn't satisfied by Ayub Khan's pledges. When he returned to Dhaka, he declared that East Pakistan should be known as Bangladesh. On 5 December 1969 Mujib made a declaration at a public meeting, held to observe the death anniversary of his mentor Suhrawardy, that henceforth East Pakistan would be called "Bangladesh":

There was a time when all efforts were made to erase the word "Bangla" from this land and its map. The existence of the word "Bangla" was found nowhere except in the term Bay of Bengal. I on behalf of Pakistan announce today that this land will be called "Bangladesh" instead of East Pakistan.

Mujib's fiery rhetoric ignited Bengali nationalism and pro-independence aspirations among the masses, students, professionals, and intellectuals of East Pakistan. Many observers believed that Bengali nationalism was a rejection of Pakistan's founding Two-Nation Theory but Mujib never phrased his rhetoric in these terms. Mujib was able to galvanise support throughout East Pakistan, which was home to the majority of Pakistan's population. He became one of the most powerful political figures in the Indian subcontinent. Bengalis increasingly referred to him as Bangabandhu.

1970 election 

Prior to the scheduled general election for 1970, one of the most powerful cyclones on record devastated East Pakistan, leaving half a million people dead and millions displaced. President Yahya Khan, who was flying back from China after the cyclone, viewed the devastation from the air. The ruling military junta was slow to respond with relief efforts. Newspapers in East Pakistan accused the federal government of "gross neglect, callous inattention, and bitter indifference". Mujib remarked that "We have a large army but it is left to the British Marines to bury our dead". International aid had to pour in due to the slow response of the Pakistani military regime. Bengalis were outraged at what was widely considered to be the weak and ineffective response of the federal government to the disaster. Public opinion and political parties in East Pakistan blamed the ruling military junta for the lack of relief efforts. The dissatisfaction led to divisions between East Pakistanis and West Pakistanis within the civil services, police and Pakistani Armed Forces.

In the Pakistani general elections held on 7 December 1970, the Awami League won 167 out of 169 seats belonging to East Pakistan in the National Assembly of Pakistan, as well as a landslide in the East Pakistan Provincial Assembly. The Awami League emerged as the single largest party in the federal parliament of Pakistan. With 167 seats, it was past the halfway mark of 150 seats in the 300 member national assembly and had the right to form a government of its own. Sheikh Mujib was widely considered to be the Prime Minister-elect, including by President Yahya Khan. The Pakistan Peoples Party (PPP) came in second with 86 seats. The new parliament was scheduled to hold its first sitting in Dhaka, Pakistan's legislative capital under the 1962 constitution. The political crisis emerged when PPP leader Zulfikar Ali Bhutto declared that his party would boycott parliament if Mujib formed the next government. Bhutto threatened to break the legs of any West Pakistani MP-elect who accepted Mujib's mandate. However, Khan Abdul Wali Khan of the Awami National Party from North West Frontier Province was open to accepting an Awami League government and travelled to Dhaka to meet with Mujib. Many in Pakistan's establishment were opposed to Mujib becoming Pakistan's prime minister. At the time neither Mujib nor the Awami League had explicitly advocated political independence for East Pakistan, but smaller nationalist groups were demanding independence for Bangladesh.

Both Bhutto and Yahya Khan travelled to Dhaka for negotiations with the Awami League. Mujib's delegation included the notable lawyer and constitutional expert Kamal Hossain. The Bengali negotiating position is extensively discussed in Kamal Hossain's autobiography Bangladesh: Quest for Freedom and Justice. The Pakistani government was represented by former chief justice Alvin Robert Cornelius. At the InterContinental Dhaka, Bengali chefs refused to cook food for Yahya Khan. Governor Sahabzada Yaqub Khan requested the Awami League to end the strike of the chefs at the InterContinental Hotel.

Bhutto feared civil war, and sent a secret message to Mujib and his inner circle to arrange a meeting with them. Mubashir Hassan met with Mujib and persuaded him to form a coalition government with Bhutto. They decided that Bhutto would serve as president, with Mujib as Prime Minister. These developments took place secretly and no Pakistan Armed Forces personnel were kept informed. Meanwhile, Bhutto increased the pressure on Yahya Khan to take a stand on dissolving the government.

Establishment of Bangladesh

Civil disobedience
The National Assembly was scheduled to meet in Dhaka on 3 March 1971. President Yahya Khan indefinitely postponed the assembly's first sitting, which triggered an uprising in East Pakistan. The cities of Dhaka, Chittagong, Rajshahi, Rangpur, and Khulna were engulfed with protests. Amid signs of an impending crackdown, Mujib addressed the people of East Pakistan on 7 March 1971 at the Ramna Race Course Maidan. In his speech, Mujib laid out the political history of Pakistan since partition and told the crowd that "[w]e gave blood in 1952; we won a mandate in 1954; but we were still not allowed to take up the reigns of this country". While Mujib stopped short of declaring outright independence, he stated that the goal of the Awami League from then on would be eventual independence. He declared that the Awami League would collect taxes and form committees in every neighbourhood to organise resistance. He called on the people "to turn every house into a fortress". His most famous words from the speech were the following.

This time the struggle is for our liberation! This time the struggle is for our independence!(For more info, see: 7 March Speech of Bangabandhu)

Following the speech, 17 days of civil disobedience known as the non-cooperation movement took place across East Pakistan. The Awami League began to collect taxes while all monetary transfers to West Pakistan were suspended. East Pakistan came under the de facto control of the Awami League. On 23 March 1971, Bangladeshi flags were flown throughout East Pakistan on Pakistan's Republic Day as a show of resistance. The Awami League and the Pakistani military leadership continued negotiations over the transfer of power. However, West Pakistani troops were being flown into the eastern wing through PIA flights while arms were being unloaded from Pakistan Navy ships in Chittagong harbour. The Pakistani military was preparing for a crackdown.

Outbreak of war
Talks broke down on 25 March 1971 when Yahya Khan left Dhaka, declared martial law, banned the Awami League and ordered the Pakistan Army to arrest Mujib and other Bengali leaders and activists. The Pakistan Army launched Operation Searchlight. Mujib sent telegrams to Chittagong where M. A. Hannan from the Awami League and Major Ziaur Rahman from the East Bengal Regiment announced the Bangladeshi declaration of independence on Mujib's behalf. The text of Mujib's telegram sent at midnight on 26 March 1971 stated the following:

Shortly after having declared the independence of Bangladesh, Mujib was arrested without charges and flown to prison in West Pakistan after midnight. Mujib was moved to West Pakistan and kept under heavy guard in a jail near Faisalabad. Sheikh Mujib was later moved to Central Jail Mianwali where he remained in solitary confinement for the entirety of the war. Kamal Hossain was also arrested and flown to West Pakistan while many other League leaders escaped to India. Pakistani general Rahimuddin Khan was appointed to preside over Mujib's court-martial trial, the proceedings of which have never been made public. Mujib was sentenced to death but his execution was deferred on three occasions.

The Pakistan Army's operations in East Pakistan were widely labelled as genocide. The Pakistan Army carried out atrocities against Bengali civilians. With help from Jamaat militias like the Razakars, Al-Badr and Al-Shams, the army targeted Bengali intellectuals, professionals, politicians, students, and other ordinary civilians. Many Bengali women suffered rape. Due to the deteriorating situation, large numbers of Hindus fled across the border to the neighbouring Indian states of West Bengal, Assam and Tripura. Bengali army and police regiments soon revolted and League leaders formed the Provisional Government of Bangladesh. A major insurgency led by the Mukti Bahini arose across East Pakistan. Despite international pressure, the Pakistani government refused to release Mujib and negotiate with him. Mujib's family was kept under house arrest during this period. General Osmani was the key military commanding officer in the Mukti Bahini. Following Indian intervention in December, the Pakistan Army surrendered to the allied forces of Bangladesh and India.

Homecoming
Upon assuming the presidency after Yahya Khan's resignation, Zulfikar Ali Bhutto responded to international pressure and released Mujib on 8 January 1972.  Kamal Hossain was also released. Bhutto and Aziz Ahmed secretly met Mujib and Kamal Hossain in Rawalpindi. Bhutto proposed a last minute attempt at mediation through the Shah of Iran, who was scheduled to arrive the next day. Mujib declined the offer after consulting with Kamal Hossain. Mujib requested a flight to London.
 Both Mujib and Hossain were then flown to London. Enroute to London, their plane made a stopover in Cyprus for refuelling. In London, Mujib was welcomed by British officials and a policeman remarked "Sir, we have been praying for you". Mujib was lodged at Claridge's Hotel and later met with British Prime Minister Edward Heath at 10 Downing Street. Heath and Mujib discussed Bangladesh's membership of the Commonwealth. Crowds of Bengalis converged on Claridge's Hotel to get a glimpse of Mujib.
Mujib held his first press conference in 9 months and addressed the international media at Claridge's Hotel. He made the following remarks at the press conference.

I am free to share the unbounded joy of freedom with my fellow countrymen. We have won our freedom in an epic liberation struggle.

Mujib was provided an RAF plane by the British government to take him back to newly independent Bangladesh. He was accompanied on the flight by members of the Provisional Government of Bangladesh, as well as an emissary of India's premier Indira Gandhi. The emissary was Indian Bengali diplomat Shashank Banerjee, who recounted Mujib smoking his trademark smoking pipe with Erinmore tobacco. During the flight, both men agreed that Bangladesh would adopt the Westminster style of parliamentary government. On Indira Gandhi's hopes for Bangladesh, Banerjee told Mujib that "on India’s eastern flank, she wished to have a friendly power, a prosperous economy, and a secular democracy, with a parliamentary system of government". Regarding the presence of Indian troops in Bangladesh, Mujib requested Banerjee to convey to the Indian government that Indian troops should be withdrawn as early as possible. The RAF de Havilland Comet made a stopover in the Middle East enroute to Dhaka.

The RAF plane then made a stopover in New Delhi. Mujib was received by Indian President V. V. Giri and Prime Minister Indira Gandhi, as well as the entire Indian cabinet and chiefs of armed forces. Delhi was given a festive look as Mujib and Gandhi addressed a huge crowd where he publicly expressed his gratitude to Gandhi and the Indian public.

After a few hours in Delhi, the RAF plane flew Mujib to Dhaka in independent Bangladesh. Before the plane landed, it circled the city to view the million people who converged on Tejgaon Airport to greet Mujib. In Dhaka, Mujib's homecoming was described as "one of the most emotional outbursts in that emotional part of the world". Crowds overwhelmed the airport tarmac and breached the security cordon as cabinet ministers went inside the plane to bring Mujib out. Mujib was given a guard of honour by members of the nascent Bangladesh Army, Bangladesh Navy, and Bangladesh Air Force. Mujib was driven in an open truck through the dense crowds for a speech at the Ramna Race Course, where ten months earlier he had announced the liberation movement.

Governing Bangladesh 

Mujib briefly assumed the provisional presidency and later took office as the prime minister. In January 1972 Time magazine reported that "[i]n the aftermath of the Pakistani army's rampage last March, a special team of inspectors from the World Bank observed that some cities looked "like the morning after a nuclear attack". Since then, the destruction has only been magnified. An estimated 6,000,000 homes have been destroyed, and nearly 1,400,000 farm families have been left without tools or animals to work their lands. Transportation and communications systems are totally disrupted. Roads are damaged, bridges out and inland waterways blocked. The rape of the country continued right up until the Pakistani army surrendered a month ago. In the last days of the war, West Pakistani-owned businesses—which included nearly every commercial enterprise in the country—remitted virtually all their funds to the West. Pakistan International Airlines left exactly 117 rupees ($16) in its account at the port city of Chittagong. The army also destroyed bank notes and coins, so that many areas now suffer from a severe shortage of ready cash. Private cars were picked up off the streets or confiscated from auto dealers and shipped to the West before the ports were closed.

The new government of Bangladesh quickly converted East Pakistan's state apparatus into the machinery of an independent Bangladeshi state. For example, a presidential decree transformed the High Court of East Pakistan into the Supreme Court of Bangladesh. The Awami League successfully reorganised the bureaucracy, framed a written constitution, and rehabilitated war victims and survivors. In January 1972, Mujib introduced a parliamentary republic through a presidential decree. The emerging state structure was influenced by the Westminster model in which the Prime Minister was the most powerful leader while the President acted on the government's advice. MPs elected during the 1970 general election became members of the Constituent Assembly of Bangladesh. The Constitution Drafting Committee led by Dr. Kamal Hossain produced a draft constitution which was adopted on 4 November 1972 and came into force on 16 December 1972. In comparison to the prolonged constitution-making process in Pakistan during the 1950s, the Awami League was credited for swiftly enacting the Constitution of Bangladesh within just one year of independence. However, the League is criticised for this swift enactment because the Constituent Assembly was largely made up of members from the League itself; the few opposition lawmakers included Manabendra Narayan Larma, who demanded the term "Bangladeshi" to describe the new country's citizens instead of "Bengali" since not all Bangladeshis were Bengalis. Critics argued that in reality "the Awami League sought to rule by Mujib's charisma and build a political process by dicta".

Mujib introduced a quota for backward regions to get access to public sector jobs. Bangladesh also faced a gun control problem because many of its guerrilla fighters from the Liberation War were roaming the country with guns. Mujib successfully called on former guerrillas to surrender their arms through public ceremonies which affirmed their status as freedom fighters during the Liberation War. The President's Relief and Welfare Fund was created to rehabilitate an estimated 10 million displaced Bangladeshis. Mujib established 11,000 new primary schools and nationalised 40,000 primary schools.

Withdrawal of Indian troops
One of Mujib's first priorities was the withdrawal of Indian troops from Bangladesh. Mujib requested the Indian government to ensure a swift withdrawal of Indian military forces from Bangladeshi territory. A timeline was drawn up for rapid withdrawal. The withdrawal took place within three months of the surrender of Pakistan to the allied forces of Bangladesh and India. A formal ceremony was held in Dhaka Stadium on 12 March 1972 in which Mujib inspected a guard of honour from the 1st Rajput Regiment. The withdrawal of Indian forces was completed by 15 March. Many countries established diplomatic relations with Bangladesh soon after the withdrawal of Indian troops. India's intervention and subsequent withdrawal has been cited as a successful case of humanitarian intervention in international law.

War criminals
In 1972, Mujib told David Frost that he was a strong man but he had tears in his eyes when he saw pictures of the 1971 Bangladesh genocide. He told Frost that "I am a very generous man. I always believe in forgive and forget but this is impossible on my part to forgive and forget. This was cold blooded murder in a planned way; genocide to kill my people. These people must be punished". Speaking about a potential war crimes trial, Mujib said "the world powers arranged the Nuremberg trials against the war criminals of fascist Germany. I think they should come forward and there should be another trial or inquiry under the United Nations". Mujib pledged to hold a trial for those accused in wartime atrocities.  An estimated 11,000 local collaborators of the Pakistan Army were arrested. Their cases were heard by the Collaborators Tribunal. In 1973, the government introduced the International Crimes (Tribunal) Act to prosecute 195 Pakistani PoWs under Indian custody. In response, Pakistan filed a case against India at the International Court of Justice. The Delhi Agreement struck a compromise between India, Pakistan and Bangladesh after the three countries agreed to transfer PoWs to Pakistani custody. However, the foreign minister of Bangladesh stated that "the excesses and manifold crimes committed by those prisoners of war constituted, according to the relevant provisions of the UN General Assembly resolutions and international law, war crimes, crimes against humanity and genocide, and that there was universal consensus that persons charged with such crimes as [the] 195 Pakistani prisoners of war should be held to account and subjected to the due process of law". In 1974, the Third International Criminal Law Conference was held at the Bangladesh Institute of Law and International Affairs; the meeting supported calls for the creation of an international penal court.

Economic policy
Mujib declared socialism as a national policy. His land reforms restricted land ownership to less than 25 bighas of land which effectively ended all traces of the zamindari system. Land owners with more than 25 bighas were subjected to taxes. Farmers had to sell their products at prices set by the government instead of the market. Mujib nationalised all banks, insurance companies, and 580 industrial plants. There was little foreign investment. The stock exchange remained closed. In 1974, the government sought to invite international oil companies to explore the Bay of Bengal for oil and natural gas. Shell sold five gas fields to the Bangladeshi government which set the stage for the creation of Petrobangla. The national airline Biman was set up with planes from British Caledonian, the Indian government and the World Council of Churches. In the industrial sector, the Bangladeshi government built the Ghorashal Fertilizer Factory. Work began on the Ashuganj Power Station. Operations in the Port of Chittagong were restored after the Soviet Navy conducted a clearing operation for naval mines.

The Mujib government faced serious challenges, which included the resettlement of millions of people displaced in 1971, organisation of food supply, health services and other necessities. The effects of the 1970 cyclone had not worn off, and the economy of Bangladesh had immensely deteriorated due to the conflict. In 1973, thousands of Bengalis arrived from Pakistan while many non-Bengali industrialists and capitalists emigrated; poorer non-Bengalis were stranded in refugee camps. Major efforts were launched to help an estimated 10 million former refugees who returned from India. The economy began to recover eventually. A five-year plan released in 1973 focused state investments into agriculture, rural infrastructure and cottage industries. But a famine occurred in 1974 when the price of rice rose sharply. In that month there was widespread starvation in Rangpur district. Government mismanagement was blamed. Many of Mujib's disastrous socialist policies were eventually overturned by future governments. The five years of his regime marked the only intensely socialist period in Bangladesh's history. Successive governments de-emphasised socialism and promoted a market economy. By the 1990s, the Awami League returned to being a centre-left party in economics.

Secularism

While Pakistan adopted progressive reforms to Muslim family law as early as 1961, Bangladesh became the first constitutionally secular state in South Asia in 1972 when its newly adopted constitution included the word "secularism" for the first time in the region. Despite the constitution's proclamation of secularism as a state policy, Mujib banned "anti-Islamic" activities, including gambling, horse racing and alcohol. He established the Islamic Foundation to regulate religious affairs for Muslims, including the collection of zakat and setting dates for religious observances like Eid and Ramadan. Under Mujib, Bangladesh joined the Organization of the Islamic Conference (OIC) in 1974. Bangladesh was not the only Muslim-majority secular republic in the OIC; others included Turkey and Nigeria. Secularism was later removed from the constitution by the military dictatorship in the late 1970s. Secularism was reinstated by the Supreme Court into the constitution in 2010.

Foreign policy

Mujib's major foreign policy achievement was to secure normalisation and diplomatic relations with most countries of the world. Bangladesh joined the Commonwealth, the UN, the OIC, and the Non-Aligned Movement. His allies included Prime Minister Indira Gandhi of India and Marshal Tito of Yugoslavia. Mujib delivered a historic speech to the United Nations General Assembly in Bengali in 1974. This was the first time Bengali was spoken in the UN General Assembly. The speech laid out the genesis of Bangladesh's foreign policy. Mujib told the assembly that "[t]he Bengali has struggled for many centuries for the right to live a free and honourable life as independent citizens of an independent country. They expected to live in peace and harmony with all the nations in the world". Mujib referred to the Universal Declaration of Human Rights. He remarked that "[i]njustice is still rampant in many parts of the world. Our Arab brothers are still fighting for the complete eviction of the invaders from their land. The equitable national rights of the Palestinian people have not yet been achieved. In spite of the acceleration of the process of abolishing colonialism, it hasn’t reached its ultimate goal. This is more strongly true of Africa, where the people of Zimbabwe and Namibia are still engaged in the final struggle for national independence and absolute freedom. Although racism has been identified as a serious offence in this council, it’s still destroying the conscience of the people".

Mujib and Indira Gandhi signed the 25-year Indo-Bangladeshi Treaty of Friendship, Cooperation and Peace, which complemented India's massive economic and humanitarian assistance to Bangladesh. Mujib forged a close friendship with Indira Gandhi, strongly praising India's decision to intervene in the Bangladesh Liberation War, and professed admiration and friendship for India. In the Delhi Agreement of 1974, Bangladesh, India and Pakistan pledged to work for regional stability and peace. The agreement paved the way for the return of interned Bengali officials and their families stranded in Pakistan, as well as the establishment of diplomatic relations between Bangladesh and Pakistan. In 1974, the Land Boundary Treaty regarding India-Bangladesh enclaves was challenged in court. The government attempted to ratify the treaty without consulting parliament. Chief Justice Abu Sadat Mohammad Sayem ruled that parliament had to ratify the treaty in accordance with the constitution, otherwise the government's actions were illegal and unconstitutional. The Chief Justice dissented with the government's actions. The treaty was subsequently ratified by parliament. In his decision, Justice Sayem referred to the Vienna Convention on the Law of Treaties. The Land Boundary Agreement was finally implemented in 2015.

Japan became a major aid provider to the new country. Mujib attended Commonwealth summits in Canada and Jamaica, where he held talks with Queen Elizabeth II. The Soviet Union supplied several squadrons of MiG-21 planes for the Bangladesh Air Force. Although Israel was one of the first countries to recognise Bangladesh, Bangladesh strongly supported Egypt during the Arab-Israeli War of 1973. In return, Egypt gave Bangladesh's military 44 tanks. Algeria facilitated Bangladesh's entry into the OIC by brokering talks with Pakistan.

Left-wing insurgency

At the height of Mujib's power, left-wing insurgents from the Gonobahini fought against Mujib's government to establish a Marxist government. The government responded by forming an elite paramilitary force called Jatiya Rakkhi Bahini on 8 February 1972. Many within the Bangladeshi military viewed the new paramilitary force with suspicion. The new paramilitary force was responsible for human rights abuses against the general populace, including extrajudicial killings, shootings by death squads, and rape. Members of the Jatiya Rakkhi Bahini were granted immunity from prosecution and other legal proceedings. The force swore an oath of loyalty to Mujib.

One party state

Mujib's political philosophy dramatically changed in 1975. Elections were approaching in 1977 after the end of his five-year term. Mujib sensed growing dissatisfaction with his regime. He changed the constitution, declared himself president, and established a one party state. Ahrar Ahmed, commenting in The Daily Star, noted that "Drastic changes were introduced through the adoption of the 4th amendment on Jan[uary] 25, 1975, which radically shifted the initial focus of the constitution and turned it into a single-party, [p]residential system, which curtailed the powers of the [p]arliament and the [j]udiciary, as well as the space for free speech or public assembly". Censorship was imposed in the press. Civil society groups like the Committee for Civil Liberties and Legal Aid were suppressed.  The Bangladesh Krishak Sramik Awami League (BAKSAL), meaning the "Bangladesh Farmers Workers Peoples League", became the only legal political party. Bureaucrats and military officers were ordered to join the single party. These actions profoundly impacted Mujib's legacy. Many Bangladeshis opposed to the Awami League cite his creation of BAKSAL as the ultimate hypocrisy. The one party state lasted for 7 months till Mujib's assassination on 15 August 1975.

Assassination 

Sheikh Mujibur Rahman was killed along with most of his family in his private home on 15 August 1975 during a military coup by renegade army officers. His wife, three sons, two daughters-in-law, and a host of other relatives, personal staff, and a brigadier general of the Bangladesh Army were killed as part of the coup. After the coup, four leaders of the former Provisional Government of Bangladesh were arrested and eventually executed on 3 November 1975.

A martial law regime was established. Mujib's killers included fifteen junior army officers with ranks of colonels, majors, lieutenants and havildars. They were backed up by Awami League politician Khondaker Mostaq Ahmad who usurped the presidency. On the day of the coup, the junior officers ordered their soldiers to take over the national radio and television stations. The army chief K. M. Shafiullah could not stop the coup. His deputy Ziaur Rahman was informed about preparations for the coup but did not stop the coup plotters. Zia is considered to be the main benefactor of the coup as it paved the way for his rise to power as Bangladesh's ruler. The only survivors from Mujib's family were his daughters Sheikh Hasina and Sheikh Rehana, who were visiting Hasina's physicist husband in West Germany at the time. On 26 September 1975, the martial law regime introduced the Indemnity Ordinance, 1975, which gave legal immunity to all persons involved in the coup of 15 August 1975.

Mujib was warned about a possible coup by Indian intelligence. Mujib shrugged off these warnings by saying his own people would never hurt him. His assassins continued to enjoy immunity from prosecution for 26 years. The Indemnity Ordinance was repealed in 1996 after his daughter Sheikh Hasina was elected as Prime Minister. Hasina subsequently initiated a murder case in the courts of Bangladesh. Several of the fifteen assassins, including coup leader Syed Faruque Rahman, were arrested and put on trial. Others like Khandaker Abdur Rashid became fugitives. The fifteen were given the death penalty by a court in 1998. Five of the convicts were hanged in 2010. A sixth convict was hanged in 2020. Of the remaining fugitives, a few have died or are in hiding. In 2022, the Bangladeshi government reported that five fugitives are still on the run, including coup leader Rashid. One of the convicted assassins is living in Canada. One of the convicts is living in the United States. Bangladesh has requested Canada and the United States to deport the fugitives following the precedent set by the deportation of A.K.M. Mohiuddin Ahmed in 2007.

Family

Mujib was 18 years old when he married Fazilatunnesa. Together they had two daughters—Sheikh Hasina and Sheikh Rehana—and three sons—Sheikh Kamal, Sheikh Jamal, and Sheikh Rasel. Kamal was an organiser of the Mukti Bahini guerrilla struggle in 1971 and received a wartime commission in the Bangladesh Army during the Liberation War. Jamal was trained at the Royal Military Academy Sandhurst in Great Britain and later joined the Bangladesh Army as a Commissioned Officer. The Sheikh family was under house arrest during the Bangladesh Liberation War until 17 December, Sheikh Kamal and Jamal found the means to escape and cross over to a liberated zone, where they joined the struggle to free the country. Almost the entire Sheikh family was assassinated on 15 August 1975 during a military coup d'état. Only Sheikh Hasina and Sheikh Rehana, who were visiting West Germany, survived. Mujib is the maternal grandfather of Tulip Siddiq, British MP for Hampstead and Kilburn since the 2015 UK general election. Sajeeb Wazed is his eldest grandson.

Legacy 

In 2004, listeners of the BBC Bangla radio service ranked Mujib first among the 20 Greatest Bengalis, ahead of Asia's first Nobel laureate Rabindranath Tagore; Bangladesh's national poet Kazi Nazrul Islam; and other Bengali icons like Subhash Chandra Bose, Amartya Sen, Titumir, Begum Rokeya, Muhammad Yunus, and Ziaur Rahman. The survey was modelled on the BBC's 100 Greatest Britons poll. In 2011, the parliament of Bangladesh passed the 15th amendment to the country's constitution which referred to Mujib as the "Father of the Nation" in attached fifth, sixth, and seventh schedules covering his 7 March Speech, the declaration of independence on 26 March 1971, and the Proclamation of Independence issued by the Provisional Government on 10 April 1971.

In 2020, the government of Bangladesh celebrated Mujib Year to mark 100 years since the birth of Sheikh Mujibur Rahman in 1920. The commemorations preceded Bangladesh's 50th anniversary of independence in 2021. Mujib continues to be a revered, popular, divisive, and controversial figure in Bangladesh. His party, the Awami League, has built a personality cult around his legacy. Opponents of the League are fierce critics of Mujib's populism and authoritarianism, including his creation of BAKSAL. League supporters and other Bangladeshis credit Mujib for successfully leading the country to independence in 1971. However, Mujib's socialist and economic policies after 1971 are largely frowned upon except among his most loyal supporters and family members. Many roads, institutions, military bases, bridges and other places in Bangladesh are named in his honour. Under the Awami League's rule, Mujib's picture is printed on the national currency Bangladeshi taka. Bangladeshis across the political divide often refer to him as Bangabandhu out of respect. A satellite is also named after him.

Mujib is remembered in India as an ally. Bangabandhu Sheikh Mujib Road in New Delhi and an avenue in Kolkata in the Indian state of West Bengal are named in his honour. The Palestinian Authority named a street in Hebron in honour of Mujib. Bangabandhu Boulevard in Ankara, Turkey is named after Mujib. There is also a Bangabandhu Sheikh Mujib Street in Port Louis, Mauritius. Sheikh Mujib Way in Chicago in the United States is named after him.

Archer K. Blood described Mujib personally as urbane and charming. Politically, Gary Bass writes that Archer Blood noted that "Mujib’s very appearance suggested raw power, a power drawn from the masses and from his own strong personality. He was tall and sturdy, with rugged features and intense eyes". Blood found him serene and confident amid the turmoil, but eager for power. Blood wrote that "On the rostrum he is a fiery orator who can mesmerize hundreds of thousands in a pouring rain. Mujib has something of a messianic complex which has been reinforced by the heady experience of mass adulation. He talks of ‘my people, my land, my forests, my rivers.’ It seems clear that he views himself as the personification of Bengali aspirations". According to Time magazine, "A man of vitality and vehemence, Mujib became the political Gandhi of the Bengalis, symbolizing their hopes and voicing their grievances. Not even Pakistan's founder, Mohammed Ali Jinnah, drew the million-strong throngs that Mujib has attracted in Dacca. Nor, for that matter, has any subcontinent politician since Gandhi's day spent so much time behind bars for his political beliefs".

An Egyptian journalist noted that "Sheikh Mujibur Rahman does not belong to Bangladesh alone. He is the harbinger of freedom for all Bengalis. His Bengali nationalism is the new emergence of Bengali civilization and culture. Mujib is the hero of the Bengalis, in the past and in the times that are". Fidel Castro remarked that "I have not seen the Himalayas. But I have seen Sheikh Mujib. In personality and in courage, this man is the Himalayas. I have thus had the experience of witnessing the Himalayas". Mujib cited Abraham Lincoln, Mao Zedong, Winston Churchill, John F. Kennedy, Sukarno and Kemal Ataturk as inspirations during an interview with David Frost. Some journalists have criticised Mujib for being whimsical, "not serious", and a madman.

Portrayals

Song 
 "Shono Ekti Mujiburer Theke", a 1971 song about him, was inspiration for freedom fighters during liberation war of Bangladesh.
 A song was written about him in 1990 and recorded in 1991 named "Jodi Raat Pohale Shona Jeto" became popular during election.

Books 
 Humayun Ahmed included Sheikh Mujib in two of his historical novels, 2004's Jochona O Jononir Golpo and 2012's Deyal.
 Neamat Imam's novel The Black Coat depicts Mujib as a dictator.
 In 2015, the Centre for Research and Information (CRI) department of Bangladesh Awami League published a four-part children's comic book named Mujib based on Sheikh Mujib's two autobiographies.
 In March 2022, Muktidata Sheikh Mujib (Liberator Sheikh Mujib), a memoir of Rahman, was published.

Films 
 In the 1974 Bangladeshi film Sangram, Sheikh Mujibur Rahman was portrayed by himself.
 In the 2014 Indian film Children of War, Prodip Ganguly portrayed of Sheikh Mujib.
 In the 2018 documentary film Hasina: A Daughter's Tale, Sheikh Mujib's daughter Sheikh Hasina spoke about the assassination of her father.
 On 30 March 2021, Tungiparar Miya Bhai, a biopic of Sheikh Mujibur Rahman was released.
 On 1 October 2021, Mujib Amar Pita, an animated film about Sheikh Mujibur Rahman was released.
 On 31 December 2021, Chironjeeb Mujib, another biopic of Sheikh Mujibur Rahman was released.
 On 21 January 2021, Mujib: The Making of a Nation, a biopic of Sheikh Mujibur Rahman directed by Shyam Benegal has begun production.

Bibliography
Mujib is today celebrated as a political diarist. He kept a diary during his early political career in the 1940s and 1950s. This diary was translated into English by Fakrul Alam and published as The Unfinished Memoirs. The book was published in both India and Pakistan by Penguin Books and Oxford University Press respectively. The book has since been translated into French, Spanish, Korean, Arabic, and many other languages.
Mujib also started writing his autobiography while in prison between 1967 and 1969; this diary was published in Bengali as The Prison Diaries. Mujib wrote a travelogue of his visits to China during the 1950s. This travelogue was published as the book The New China as I Saw.

Awards

References

Notes

Citations

Bibliography

External links 

 
 
 
 
 
 
 

|-

|-

|-

|-

 
1920 births
1975 deaths
Prime Ministers of Bangladesh
1st Jatiya Sangsad members
Assassinated Bangladeshi politicians
Assassinated heads of state
Awami League politicians
General Secretaries of Awami League
Presidents of the Awami League
Bengali independence activists
Bengali Muslims
Burials at Banani Graveyard
Pakistan Movement activists from Bengal
Pakistani MNAs 1955–1958
People from Gopalganj District, Bangladesh
People from British India
People murdered in Bangladesh
Sheikh Mujibur Rahman family
Presidents of Bangladesh
Recipients of the Independence Day Award
Maulana Azad College alumni
University of Dhaka alumni
Deaths by firearm in Bangladesh
Bangladeshi people of Arab descent
20th-century Bengalis
20th-century Muslims
Muslim socialists
Bangladesh Krishak Sramik Awami League executive committee members
Bangladesh Krishak Sramik Awami League central committee members
1975 murders in Bangladesh